"The Duchess and the Jeweller" (1938) is a short story by Virginia Woolf. Woolf, being an advocate of addressing the "stream of consciousness," shows the thoughts and actions of a greedy jeweller; Woolf makes a thematic point that corrupt people do corrupt actions for purely selfish motives (and often without regret). It was first published in British Harper's Bazaar Magazine in April 1938 and subsequently published posthumously in 1944 in the collection A Haunted House and Other Short Stories.

Plot summary
Oliver Bacon is this story's protagonist. Once a poor boy in the streets of London, he has become the richest jeweller in England. As a young man, he sold stolen dogs to wealthy women and marketed cheap watches at a higher price. On a wall in his private room hangs a picture of his late mother. He frequently talks to her and reminisces, once chuckling at his past endeavors.

One day, Oliver enters into his private robin shop room, barely acknowledging his underlings, and awaits the arrival of the Duchess. When she arrives, he has her wait. In his room, with yellow gloves, he opens barred windows to get some air. Later, Oliver opens six steel safes, each containing endless riches of jewels.

The Duchess and the Jeweler are described as "... friends, yet enemies; he was master, she was mistress; each cheated the other, each needed the other, each feared the other..." On this particular day, the Duchess comes to Oliver to sell ten pearls, as she has lost substantial money to gambling. Mr. Bacon is skeptical of the pearls' authenticity, but the Duchess manipulates him into buying them for twenty thousand pounds. When the Duchess invites him to an event that includes a cast of royalty and her daughter Diana, Oliver is persuaded to write a cheque .

In the end, the pearls are found to be fakes, and Oliver looks at his mother's portrait, questioning his actions. However, what Oliver truly bought was not actually the pearls: it was Diana.

1938 short stories
Short stories by Virginia Woolf
Works originally published in Harper's Bazaar